Klinckowstroemiidae is a family of mites in the order Mesostigmata.

Species
Klinckowstroemiidae contains four genera, with 24 recognized species:

 Genus Antennurella Berlese, 1903
 Antennurella tragardhi (Baker & Wharton, 1952)
 Antennurella trouessarti Berlese, 1903
 Genus Klinckowstroemia Trägårdh, 1937
 Klinckowstroemia atramaculata Rosario & Hunter, 1988
 Klinckowstroemia candidoi Rosario & Hunter, 1988
 Klinckowstroemia concava Hunter & Butler, 1966
 Klinckowstroemia grabowskii Chernoff & Pope, 1970
 Klinckowstroemia melissae Villegas-Guzman, Reyes-Castillo & Perez, 2011
 Klinckowstroemia multisetillosa Rosario & Hunter, 1988
 Klinckowstroemia oconnori Villegas-Guzman, Reyes-Castillo & Perez, 2011
 Klinckowstroemia pennula Villegas-Guzman, Reyes-Castillo & Perez, 2011
 Klinckowstroemia reyesi Rosario & Hunter, 1988
 Klinckowstroemia schusteri Rosario & Hunter, 1988
 Klinckowstroemia scotti Rosario & Hunter, 1988
 Klinckowstroemia simplisetosa Rosario & Hunter, 1988
 Klinckowstroemia starri Rosario & Hunter, 1988
 Klinckowstroemia stilla Villegas-Guzman, Reyes-Castillo & Perez, 2011
 Klinckowstroemia tapachulensis Chernoff & Pope, 1970
 Klinckowstroemia tragardhi Baker & Wharton, 1952
 Klinckowstroemia truncata Hunter & Butler, 1966
 Klinckowstroemia victoriae Rosario & Hunter, 1988
 Genus Klinckowstroemiella Türk, 1951
 Klinckowstroemiella prima Türk, 1951
 Klinckowstroemiella trinidadis Wisniewski & Hirschmann, 1994
 Genus Similantennurella R. M. T. Rosario, 1988
 Similantennurella spinata R. M. T. Rosario, 1988
 Similantennurella aspinata Rosario, 1988

References

Mesostigmata
Acari families